Monika Havranová (born 4 April 1997) is a Slovák footballer who plays as a midfielder and has appeared for the Slovakia women's national team.

Career
Havranová has been capped for Slovakia, appearing for the team during the 2019 FIFA Women's World Cup qualifying cycle.

References

External links
 
 
 

1997 births
Living people
Slovak women's footballers
Slovakia women's international footballers
Women's association football midfielders
Slovak expatriate footballers
Expatriate women's footballers in Austria
Slovak expatriate sportspeople in Austria